Rochy Melkiano Putiray (born 26 June 1970  Indonesia) is a retired footballer from Indonesia.

Rochy was likely the most recognizable player on the Indonesia national football team because of his brightly colored and constantly changing hair. In his career, he has played for Arseto Solo, Jakarta F.C.(1999–2000), Persija Jakarta, Instant-Dict, Kitchee and South China.  He moved to Instant-Dict after being spotted by the Hong Kong club during the Asian Cup Qualifier between Hong Kong and Indonesia.  He helped Kitchee beat AC Milan 2–1 by scoring 2 goals during a friendly match in 2004. He graduated from Faculty of Law in Universitas Surakarta (UNSA), a university based in Surakarta, Indonesia. In 2012, he began to coach UNSA sport school, in his native Indonesia.

|}

Honours
Persis Solo
 Galatama-Perserikatan Invitational Championship: 1987
 Galatama: 1987

Instant-Dict
 Hong Kong FA Cup: 2000–01

South China AA
 Hong Kong Senior Shield: 2002–03

Indonesia
 AFF Championship runner-up: 2000
 Southeast Asian Games Gold Medal: 1991

Individual
 Asian Goal of the Month: April 1997

References

External links

1970 births
Living people
People from Ambon, Maluku
Indonesian footballers
Indonesia international footballers
Indonesian expatriate footballers
2000 AFC Asian Cup players
2004 AFC Asian Cup players
Indonesian Christians
arseto F.C. players
persija Jakarta players
dukla Prague footballers
PSM Makassar players
PSS Sleman players
PSPS Pekanbaru players
persijatim players
Double Flower FA players
Kitchee SC players
South China AA players
Hong Kong First Division League players
Expatriate footballers in Hong Kong
Expatriate footballers in Czechoslovakia
Southeast Asian Games gold medalists for Indonesia
Southeast Asian Games bronze medalists for Indonesia
Southeast Asian Games medalists in football
Sportspeople from Maluku (province)
Association football forwards
Competitors at the 1991 Southeast Asian Games
Competitors at the 1999 Southeast Asian Games
Hong Kong League XI representative players